Hallman may refer to :

People
Bill Hallman (second baseman) (1867–1920), American Major League Baseball player and manager
Bill Hallman (outfielder) (1876–1950), American Major League Baseball player
Curley Hallman (born 1947), head football coach at LSU and Southern Mississippi
Dennis Hallman (born 1975), American mixed martial arts fighter
Harold Hallman (1962–2005), Canadian Football League player
Joseph Hallman (born 1979), American composer
Sherwood H. Hallman (1913–1944), United States Army soldier and recipient of the Medal of Honor
Torsten Hallman (born 1940), Swedish professional motocross racer

Places
Hallman, Pennsylvania, a populated area in East Pikeland, Pennsylvania, U.S.

See also
 

English-language surnames